Easy Like, Volume 1  is an album by jazz guitarist Barney Kessel that was released by Contemporary Records in 1956. Eight songs were released on the 10-inch album Barney Kessel which were recorded in 1953, while other songs were recorded in 1956.

Reception

In the Allmusic review, Scott Yanow states that "the set features Kessel in boppish form".

Track listing

Personnel
 Barney Kessel – guitar
 Buddy Collette – alto saxophone, flute (tracks: 1, 8, 12, 13, 14)
 Bud Shank – alto saxophone, flute (tracks: 2-7, 9, 10)
 Arnold Ross – piano (tracks: 2-7, 9, 10)
 Claude Williamson – piano (tracks: 1, 8, 11, 12, 14)
 Harry Babasin – double bass (tracks: 2-7, 9, 10)
 Red Mitchell – double bass (tracks: 1, 8, 11, 12, 14)
 Shelly Manne – drums

References

Contemporary Records albums
Barney Kessel albums
1956 albums